is a Japanese voice actress and professional mahjong player. She is currently affiliated with 81 Produce.

Biography

Arisa Date was born on May 10, 1991, in Hyogo Prefecture, Japan. She lived there until the first year of Junior High School in Japan. She then moved to Osaka, Japan during her 2nd year of Junior High in Japan and lived there until her 3rd year in High School in Japan.

After she graduated from High School, Date enrolled in Ritsumeikan University studying Image Arts and Sciences. It was later revealed that Voice Actress Naomi Ōzora also studied in the same field.

In 2014 Date voiced a minor character in Saki: The Nationals which features Riichi Mahjong. She became addicted to playing Riichi Mahjong after this role. In April 2019, she announced that she became a professional mahjong player affiliated with the Japan Professional Mahjong League. In 2021, Date won her first Japan Professional Mahjong League Title by placing 1st in the 1st Sakura Bud Fight for young female professionals of the league. In August 2021, she was drafted by the Konami Mahjong Fight Club professional Mahjong team to participate in the team Riichi Mahjong tournament M-League.

Her hobbies/skills are drawing with aquarelle pencils, watching live performances, mahjong, Adobe Photoshop, and Adobe Illustrator. Her favorite artists include Yukari Tamura, Nana Mizuki, Kana Hanazawa and Saori Hayami. She likes Tomato Sauce Pasta, her parents Gyoza, and Caesar Salad, but dislikes Tomatoes, Celery, and Unagi.

Filmography

Television animation
2013
Duel Masters Victory V3

2014
Aikatsu! (Fan)
Saki: The Nationals (Suzu Ueshige)
No-Rin (Girl)
Pokémon XY (Maid, Karen)
Shounen Hollywood (Girl)

2015
The Idolmaster Cinderella Girls (Emi Namba)
PriPara (Girl)
Rin-ne (Yumi)
Punch Line (Rumi)
Venus Project: Climax (Isami Kawato)

2016
Haruchika (Chiyoko Katagiri, Kanoko Degawa)

2017
Little Witch Academia (Maril Cavendish)
Idol Time PriPara (Yui Yumekawa)

2018
Wotakoi: Love is Hard for Otaku (Narumi Momose)
The Master of Ragnarok & Blesser of Einherjar (Sigrun)

2022
World's End Harem (Rikka Yanagi)

References

External links
Official agency profile 

1991 births
Living people
Japanese video game actresses
Japanese voice actresses
Voice actresses from Hyōgo Prefecture
81 Produce voice actors